The 2001 Humanitarian Bowl was the fifth edition of the bowl game. It featured the Clemson Tigers versus the Louisiana Tech Bulldogs.

Background
This was the Bulldogs first bowl game since the 1990 tie in the Independence Bowl. They were looking to win a bowl game for the first time since 1977. They had won the Western Athletic Conference championship (in their first season there), which was their first conference championship since they won the Southland Conference in 1984. This was Clemson third consecutive bowl game and seventh in 10 seasons. They were looking to win a bowl game for the first time since the 1993 Peach Bowl. They had finished fourth in the Atlantic Coast Conference.

Game summary
Louisiana Tech scored first on a 29-yard field goal from placekicker Josh Scobee, giving the Bulldogs a 3–0 lead. Later in the first quarter, Woodrow Dantzler threw a 10-yard touchdown pass to Matt Bailey, as the Tigers took a 7–3 lead into the second quarter.

In the second quarter, Luke McCown scored on an 11-yard touchdown run giving Louisiana Tech a 10–7 lead. Woodrow Dantzler threw a 53-yard touchdown pass to Roscoe Crosby giving Clemson a 14–10 lead. They would keep that lead through halftime.

In the third quarter, Dantzler threw a 5–yard touchdown pass to Ben Hall, increasing the Tigers lead to 21–10. Dantzler's fourth touchdown pass, a 62-yarder to Bernard Rambert gave the Tigers a 28–10 lead. Bernard Rambert scored on a 21-yard touchdown run to make it 35–10. Airese Currie added a 19-yard touchdown run, as the Tigers clawed to a 42–10 led at the end of three quarters.

In the fourth quarter, backup quarterback Willie Simmons threw a 57-yard touchdown pass to Derrick Hamilton, making the lead 49–10. Louisiana Tech would score on a 34-yard touchdown pass from McCown to Delwyn Daigre to cut the lead to 49–18. They scored once more on a 2-yard Joe Smith run, making the final margin 49–24, winning their first bowl game since 1993.

Scoring summary

Statistics

References

Humanitarian Bowl
Famous Idaho Potato Bowl
Clemson Tigers football bowl games
Louisiana Tech Bulldogs football bowl games
Humanitarian Bowl
December 2001 sports events in the United States